Sassandria is a genus of harvestmen belonging to the family Assamiidae.

Species:

Sassandria bicolor 
Sassandria tenuipes

References

Harvestmen